is a Japanese yuri manga series written and illustrated by Nio Nakatani. The manga began serialization in the Japanese monthly shōnen manga magazine Dengeki Daioh on April 27, 2015, and ended on September 27, 2019. The story follows two female high school students, Yuu Koito and Touko Nanami, and the relationship that develops between them as they learn more about themselves through their experiences together.

The manga was collected in eight tankōbon volumes that were first published in Japan between October 2015 and November 2019 by ASCII Media Works under the Dengeki Comics NEXT label. The volumes were later licensed for English release in North America by Seven Seas Entertainment, and were released between January 2017 and August 2020. An anime television series adaptation by Troyca covering the first five volumes of the manga aired between October and December 2018.

Plot
First-year high school student Yuu Koito unexpectedly receives a confession from a middle school classmate, and turns him down, not knowing how to feel about such things. She later sees second-year student council member Touko Nanami turning down a confession herself and becomes convinced that Touko's situation might be similar to her own. Upon speaking to Touko, the two begin to bond over their similarities. To Yuu's surprise, Touko suddenly confesses her feelings to her. Yuu is uncertain how to respond, but Touko brushes this aside, telling Yuu that she would be very happy if Yuu were to not fall in love with her in return. Yuu agrees.

Touko declares that she will be running for the position of student council president and asks Yuu to be her campaign manager. To the dismay of Touko's best friend Sayaka Saeki, Yuu accepts the role. Despite both her and Touko being highly nervous, Yuu gives a powerful campaign speech on election day and simultaneously announces her decision to join the student council, resulting in Touko winning the election.

As president, Touko announces her intention to revive the student council play, which has not been performed in seven years. When the student council looks for someone to write a script for the play, Yuu considers that her friend Koyomi Kanou could write it, but does not mention this, wanting Touko to forget about doing the play. However, Sayaka tells Yuu to solicit Koyomi to write the script, and to look into the student council president of seven years ago. Yuu subsequently learns that Touko's older sister Mio was the student council president seven years ago and had been producing a play when she was killed in a traffic accident before its premiere. Yuu realizes that Touko wishes to produce the play in her sister's stead and tries to convince Touko that this is unnecessary, but Touko coldly refuses.

The play's production continues and Koyomi finishes the first draft. The narrative follows an amnesiac girl who must choose which person's view of her is her true self, with the original ending involving the girl choosing to be with her lover. When the student council holds a study camp to practice for the play, professional actor Tomoyuki Ichigaya, a former classmate of Mio's, is brought in to help with the rehearsals. Touko asks him about her sister and learns that Mio was a very different person than who she is now, leaving her conflicted. Concerned, Yuu has Koyomi change the ending to have the protagonist choose to be herself instead of conforming to a specific person's view, believing that this will help Touko come to terms with herself. When the play is performed at the cultural festival, its narrative and Touko's performance are acclaimed by the audience, and the manager of a local theater troupe approaches Touko, asking her to join them and become an actress. She initially declines, but eventually reconsiders and accepts.

Touko thanks Yuu again for her support and reiterates her wish for Yuu to stay with her as she is. However, Yuu has slowly begun to reconsider how she feels towards Touko and abruptly confesses her love. She misinterprets Touko's shocked response as rejection and runs away, causing Touko to realize that she has been overly imposing towards Yuu. Meanwhile, Sayaka speaks with café owner Miyako Kodama, with whom she confides her own romantic feelings for Touko. When the second-years take a class trip to Kyoto, Sayaka formally confesses to Touko. Touko is somewhat surprised but eventually turns Sayaka down, acknowledging her love for Yuu. Although dejected, Sayaka accepts this. Elsewhere, Yuu realizes that she is running away from her problems. Upon Touko's return, the two reconcile, and Yuu openly reciprocates Touko's feelings for the first time.

Over time, Yuu and Touko meet up at various places together and gradually become more emotionally and physically intimate with each other. This culminates when they go bowling together, with the agreement that whoever wins gets to request something from the other. Yuu wins and asks to sleep over at Touko's house. Touko agrees, confessing she had wanted to arrange that as well. On the day, Yuu arrives at Touko's parents' condo, where they spend the evening together. Touko waits as Yuu takes a bath, and when she later comes into Touko's bedroom, they have sex.

Some years later, Yuu and Touko have graduated high school, enrolled in college, and are now wearing rings on their fingers. They reunite with the former student council members to attend the cultural festival at their old high school.  As Yuu and Touko reminisce about how their relationship started and reflect on their new lives as adults, they walk off into the night.

Characters

 Voiced by: Hisako Kanemoto (manga PV), Yūki Takada (anime) (Japanese); Tia Ballard (English)
Yuu is a 15-year-old high school girl at Toomi Higashi High School who has trouble experiencing feelings of love. She's the type that finds it hard to refuse any requests asked upon her.

 Voiced by: Minako Kotobuki (manga PV, anime) (Japanese); Luci Christian (English)
 Touko is a 16-year-old high school girl and the student council president. She had trouble experiencing feelings of love until she met Yuu. While on the outside she seems dependable and unshakable, inside she has hidden her fears and desires especially when it comes to everyone else comparing her to her deceased sister. Only Yuu has deduced this and seen her vulnerable side.

 Voiced by: Ai Kayano (Japanese); Shanae'a Moore (English)
 Sayaka is Touko's best friend since their first year of high school, and feels she knows Touko best. She is a second-year high school girl and the student council vice president. She is secretly in love with Touko, but she keeps this to herself, unwilling to jeopardize their existing relationship. She decided that she was fine simply supporting her friend however she could.

 Voiced by: Taichi Ichikawa (Japanese); Clint Bickham (English)
 Seiji is a first-year high school boy and a member of the student council. He grew up surrounded by two older sisters and a younger sister, so he finds it easy to talk with girls.

 Voiced by: Shō Nogami (Japanese); Greg Cote (English)
 Doujima is a first-year high school boy and a member of the student council.

 Voiced by: Konomi Kohara (Japanese); Brittney Karbowski (English)
 Koyomi is Yuu's classmate and friend from middle school. She wants to become a writer.

 Voiced by: Yuka Terasaki (Japanese); Amber Lee Connors (English)
 Akari is Yuu's classmate and friend from middle school. She is a member of the basketball club.

 Voiced by: Mai Nakahara (Japanese); Patricia Duran (English)
 Hakozaki is a literature teacher and the student council's staff advisor.

 Voiced by: Nanako Mori (Japanese); Samantha Stevens (English)
 Miyako is the manager of a café that the student council members frequent. She is in a relationship with Riko Hakozaki and the two of them live in an apartment together.

 Voiced by: Mikako Komatsu (Japanese); Marissa Lenti (English)
 Rei is Yuu's older sister who attends university. She has a boyfriend, Hiro, who visits the family regularly. She likes to bake. She also seems to realize there is something between Yuu and Touko.

 Voiced by: Kazuyuki Okitsu (Japanese); Blake Shepard (English)
 Tomoyuki is a professional actor who was a classmate of Mio Nanami seven years ago.

Production
Bloom Into You was conceived by Nakatani after she became known primarily through her work on doujinshi, especially those based on the Touhou Project series. Because her works were primarily about girl-girl relationships, she gained a reputation as a "yuri mangaka," leading the editor of Dengeki Daioh (in which she had professionally debuted with their publication of her previously self-published short Farewell to My Alter) to approach her at a doujinshi convention, asking if she wanted to draw a yuri series for the magazine. Although Nakatani viewed her works as being about "human relationships" and had not intentionally set out to write yuri, she had already been considering trying to write a "love story" and thus accepted the offer. This led Nakatani to create Bloom Into You, with the intention of creating a yuri story "that could only be seen as yuri no matter which way you looked at it."

Media

Manga
The manga is written and illustrated by Nio Nakatani. It began serialization in ASCII Media Works' monthly magazine Dengeki Daioh on April 27, 2015 and ended on September 27, 2019. The eighth and final tankōbon volume of the manga was released in November 2019. Describing the series as having “…Adorable artwork and [a] charming love story,” Seven Seas Entertainment announced its licensing of the manga for English release in North America on February 14, 2016. The manga is currently published in Japanese, English, Korean, Traditional Chinese, Simplified Chinese, Thai, French, Italian, German and Spanish.

The manga was relaunched as a full-color webtoon by Kadokawa Future Publishing's Tatesuku Comic imprint. It began serialization on BookWalker August 11, 2021.

Anthology
Two volumes of an official manga anthology were published by Kadokawa and released between December 2018 and March 2020. Seven Seas announced its licensing of the manga anthology for English release in North America on December 4, 2020.

Novel
A side-story novel, is written by Hitoma Iruma and published through Kadokawa's Dengeki Bunko imprint since November 10, 2018. The second volume was released on May 10, 2019, and the third volume was released on March 10, 2020. Seven Seas Entertainment announced in July 2019 that they had licensed the series for release in English in North America.

Anime
A 13-episode anime television series adaptation was announced in the June issue of the Dengeki Daioh magazine on April 27, 2018. It was animated by Troyca, produced by Kadokawa, Docomo Anime Store, AT-X, Sony Music Solutions and Kadokawa Media House and directed by Makoto Katō, with Jukki Hanada handling series composition, Hiroaki Gōda designing the characters and Michiru Ōshima composing the music. The series aired in Japan from October 5 to December 28, 2018. Sentai Filmworks has licensed the series outside of Asia and are streaming it on Hidive in both subtitled and English dubbed formats.

Stage play
A stage play adaptation of the manga ran in Japan in May 2019. A second stage play, adapting events in the Regarding Saeki Sayaka light novels, ran from October to November 2020. An encore performance of the stage play, with a script revised to include the events of the manga's conclusion, was announced in October 2019 as part of the "Curtain Call" project following the end of the manga's serialization. It was planned for the fall of 2020, however, it was delayed due to the COVID-19 pandemic. In July 2022, the encore was rescheduled to be performed between November 25 and December 4, 2022, with the previous main cast slated to reprise their roles.

Reception
As of 2019, there are 1,000,000 copies in print in Japan alone.  It placed 4th in the 2017 Next Manga Awards from Niconico and Da Vinci. The manga has also ranked on Oricon's weekly manga rankings chart, with Volume 4 reaching 30th place and Volume 5 reaching 21st place. The manga placed 3rd in AnimeJapan's 2018 "Manga Most Wanted as Anime by Fans" poll.

In September 2020, Nicki "YuriMother" Bauman wrote about the series, describing it as "one of the most successful yuri works," saying it defies many tropes associated with yuri, while accepting others, with tropes especially in the relationship between protagonists Yuu Koito and Touko Nanami, Sayaka harboring a crush on Touko, just like "Tomoyo from Cardcaptor Sakura, Tamao in Strawberry Panic!, and...A Certain Scientific Railguns Kuroko" and said that some parts of the anime contribute to the trope of "the predatory lesbian" and noted the discussion about supposed asexuality in the series. On the other hand, she stated that the "best qualities" of the series are challenging and manipulating yuri tropes, especially when it comes to "pure" relationships and against the idea of "transitory same-sex love," stating this idea is countered in the relationship between Sayaka and Touko.

Notes

References

External links

 Official Website 
  
 

2015 manga
2018 Japanese novels
2010s LGBT-related drama television series
2010s LGBT literature
ASCII Media Works manga
AT-X (TV network) original programming
Dengeki Bunko
Dengeki Daioh
Japanese LGBT-related animated television series
Kadokawa Dwango franchises
Light novels
Romance anime and manga
School life in anime and manga
Sentai Filmworks
Seven Seas Entertainment titles
Shōnen manga
Stage play franchises
Troyca
Works impacted by the COVID-19 pandemic
Yuri (genre) anime and manga
Yuri (genre) light novels